{{Infobox writer 
| name         = John Kay
| image        =
| caption      =
| birth_date    = 
| birth_place   = Bury, Lancashire
| death_date    =
| death_place   =
| occupation   = poet, Teacher
| nationality  = British
| period       = 1980–present
| genre        =
| subject      =
| website      = 
| portaldisp   = y
}}

John Kay (born 5 April 1958) is a British poet and teacher who is currently living in Bournemouth, Dorset.

Poetry competitions
Kay has taken part in many poetry competitions, including:

EFL Poetry Competition 1999 (1st)
Middlesex Full Circle Competition 1999 (1st)
Chiltern Writer’s Competition 2000 (1st)
SEAL Open Poetry Competition 2003 (1st)
Poole Poetry Slam 2004 (2nd)
Ottaker’s/Faber Poetry Competition 2004 (1st)
Partners 21st Open Poetry Competition 2006 (Highly Commended)
Long-listed, Bridport Poetry Prize 2006
2007, Virginia Warby Poetry Prize 2006 (3rd)
Long-listed, Bridport Poetry Prize

Magazines and publications
During 2020 and into 2021 John Kay was a regular contributor to Pat Sissons' lunchtime radio programme on BBC Radio Solent, where he had over 40 poems broadcast. His most recent poetry collection (2019) is entitled 'She Stole My Northern Heart', published by A Million Ways Press. It has received great reviews and I believe a signed copy can be obtained from his website at 'johnkaypoet.co.uk' Kay has most recently been published in A Million Ways: The LOST/FOUND Issue and also been involved with a number of other publications; these include Poet in Profile, South 35, 2007, Interpreter’s House, South, Doors, Poetry File and his local newspaper, the Bournemouth Daily Echo''.
His first collection of verse, 'It Wouldn't Do' was published in 2008. His most recent collection 'She stole my northern heart' was published in 2019 by A Million Ways.

Performance
Kay has been actively involved with a number of readings locally and further afield, these include among others:
Christchurch Poetry Festival 2002
Wimborne Poetry Festival 2002
Word and Action, Dorset 2002
Poetry Café NPS, London 2002
Glenmoor School 2003
Wimborne Library 2003
National Poetry Day/Russel-Cotes Museum, Bournemouth, 2003
Poole Poetry Slam 2004
Wessex Poetry Festival 2004
National Poetry Day/Russel-Cotes Museum, Bournemouth, 2004
National Poetry Day/Russel-Cotes Museum, Bournemouth, 2005
Ferndown Upper School, 2006
South, Waterstones, Southampton, 2006
South, Bournemouth University, 2007
Reading with Malcolm Povey Bournemouth University 2007
Sounds 07 Festival, Kingston Lacy House, Wimborne, 2007
Poetry Reading at 'All Fired Up' Cafe in Bournemouth, 2008

References
 Bournemouth Literary Festival
 The Bridport Prize 2008 - Poetry Long List
 The Interpreter's House - No 21 - October 2002
 The Interpreter's House
 The Arts in Purbeck - Bournemouth Literary Festival 2008 – A World of Words
 British Council - Poems
 South - No. 30 - October 2004
 Bournemouth Arts - Bournemouth and Beyond: Arts Events and Information 23 March 2007

External links
 South
 Interpreters House
 North
 Bournemouth Literary Festival

1958 births
Living people
Writers from Bournemouth
People from Bury, Greater Manchester
English male poets